Judson High School is a public, co-educational secondary school in Converse, Texas, United States, 15 miles northeast of downtown San Antonio. It was established in 1959 as part of the Judson Independent School District, and is currently classified as a 6A school by the University Interscholastic League (UIL). Judson High School is the second oldest International Baccalaureate World School in Texas, since 1985. The school and the District were named after Moses Campbell Judson, who served on the Bexar County School Board from 1918 to 1939. His nephew Jack Judson was on the board when the decision was made to name the new rural high school Judson.

For a portion of its history up through 2010, Judson High School used a dual campus system wherein juniors and seniors attended the "Red Campus" and freshmen and sophomores attended the "Gray Campus." Previous to this dual campus system, Judson also had an atypical structure because it only housed grades 10-12 with the middle schools supporting grades 7-9. These structural departures from a typical high school system were due to efforts to accommodate the area's rapid population growth.

A single building now houses all departments with the exception of the agriculture facilities. All original buildings that made up the Red Campus were razed in 2011 to make way for new athletic fields and tennis courts, and the Gray Campus was re-purposed into Judson Middle School. The Judson ISD Performing Arts Center (PAC), constructed in 1998, houses the band, choir, orchestra, and drama classes. The PAC facility has a recital hall that seats 216 people, and an Auditorium that has 840 seats. The Judson ISD Performing Arts Center is physically connected to Judson High School via a vestibule.

Judson was named a National Blue Ribbon School in 1999-2000.

Before 2005 Judson was the only high school in the district. Karen Wagner High School opened in Fall 2005, and in Fall 2016 the district opened a third high school, Veterans Memorial High School.

Athletics 
Judson's athletic programs have experienced state championship success in several sports amassing 10 state championships (6 in football, 3 in track and field, and 1 in basketball).

Football

The Judson Rocket football program emerged as a perennial power in the 1977 season. Judson won its first state championship in 1983.

D.W. Rutledge coached the Rockets until 2000 amassing a record of 198-31-5 taking the Rockets to seven state championship games, and winning four state titles. The football stadium is named after Coach Rutledge in his honor.

After the 2000 season, the team went to the state playoffs in nine of eleven seasons making three championship game appearances and winning one state championship.

Mark Smith, formerly of Kerrville Tivy High School where he coached Heisman Trophy winner Johnny Manziel, assumed head coaching duties at Judson from 2012 through 2013.

Sean McAuliffe, an alumnus of Judson High School and its football program, became the head coach starting with the 2014 season.

Judson offensive coordinator Rodney Williams became head coach in May 2019. In his first season Williams led the Rockets to a regular season record of 9-1, but the team lost to Lake Travis 48-35 in the Region 4 Final, finishing the season at 12-2.

Judson has made it to the playoffs 42 times over 59 total seasons, advanced to the state semifinal level 18 times, reached the state title game 11 times, and won the state championship six times.

Judson holds the all-time Texas state record with 46 consecutive winning seasons from 1977 through 2022. The team last finished with a losing record in 1976 and is a combined 462-106-5 during the streak. The previous record for consecutive winning seasons was 36 set by Plano Senior High School. During the current streak, Judson has won over 80 percent of its games, and the worst record in 44 years is 7-5 with a worst regular season record of 6-4 (happened 4 times).

Judson's season records during the streak from 1977-2022 are below.

Basketball

The Judson Rocket boys basketball program has been a perennial contender under coach Michael Wacker.  Judson has been to the UIL state tournament three times: 1992-1993, 2000-2001, and 2013-2014.  In all three instances, Judson lost to the eventual state champion. The Rockets finished the 2014 season with a record of 37-2, the best record in Judson boys basketball history.

Under coach Triva Corrales, the Judson Rocket girls basketball program has been to the UIL state tournament four times (2017-2020) losing to the eventual state champion in 2017, 2018, and 2020. Judson beat Desoto in 2019 to claim its first state title in girls basketball.

Softball

The Judson Rocket girls softball program has emerged as a very competitive program under coach Theresa Urbanovsky.  Judson made its first UIL state tournament in 2021. The Rockets finished the 2021 season with a record of 35-3, the best record in Judson girls softball history.

Track and Field

Judson track and field programs have experienced significant success having won 3 state titles. The boys team won the 2013 Texas 5A state track meet, and the girls team won consecutive Texas 5A/6A state championships in 2014 and 2015.

Wrestling

The wrestling program has recent individual state titles in the 140 lbs. weight class through Aaron Walker (2010-5th, 2011-1st, 2012-1st).

Notable alumni
 Mike Azzaro (Class of 1983) — former professional polo player
 Eric Brown (Class of 1993) — former NFL safety for the Denver Broncos and Houston Texans
 Tre Flowers (Class of 2013) — current NFL cornerback for the Cincinnati Bengals
 Phillip Gaines (Class of 2009) — current NFL cornerback for the Houston Texans
 Derwin Gray (Class of 1989) — evangelist and former NFL defensive back for the Indianapolis Colts and Carolina Panthers
 Otis Grigsby (Class of 1999) — former NFL defensive end for the Miami Dolphins and Minnesota Vikings
Anthony Hutchison (Class of 1978) — former NFL running back for the Cincinnati Bengals and Buffalo Bills
 Rob Housler (Class of 2006) — former NFL tight end who has played for the Arizona Cardinals, Cleveland Browns, Chicago Bears and New England Patriots
 Mike Jinks (Class of 1990) — college football coach; former head football coach at Bowling Green State University
 Bert Richardson (Class of 1975) — judge on the Texas Court of Criminal Appeals and a San Antonio lawyer
 Corey Sears (Class of 1991) — former NFL defensive end for the Houston Texans, St. Louis Rams, and Arizona Cardinals
 Chris Samuels (Class of 1987) — former NFL running back for the San Diego Chargers
 Darnell Stephens (Class of 1991) — former NFL LB for the Tampa Bay Buccaneers
 Karen Wagner (Class of 1979) — former officer in the United States Army; died at the Pentagon in the September 11 attacks, namesake for Karen Wagner High School
 Jarveon Williams (Class of 2013) — former NFL running back for the Cincinnati Bengals
 DeMarvin Leal (Class of 2019) current defensive lineman (Defensive End) at Texas A&M University, Top 10 prospect in 2022 NFL Draft.

References

External links
Judson High School Website
Judson Independent School District Website
Judson Football Season-by-Season

Educational institutions established in 1959
1959 establishments in Texas
Judson Independent School District high schools